Xenostomella is a genus of fungi in the Microthyriaceae family.

Species
As accepted by Species Fungorum;
 Xenostomella meridensis 
 Xenostomella monninae 
 Xenostomella tovarensis

References

External links
Index Fungorum

Microthyriales